Gymnocephalus ambriaelacus is a species of freshwater ray-finned fish, a ruffe, from the family Percidae which is endemic to Lake Ammersee, in the upper Danube basin in southern Germany. The species is classified as Critically Endangered as its population is declining following the introduction of the ruffe (Gymnocephalus cernua). Some authorities suggest that this taxon may be synonymous with the Balon's ruffe (G. baloni).

References

External links
 

ambriaelacus
Freshwater fish
Fish of Europe
Endemic fauna of Germany
Taxa named by Matthias F. Geiger
Taxa named by Ulrich K. Schliewen
Fish described in 2010